Daniel Edgerly Zanes (born November 8, 1961) is an American former member of the 1980s band the Del Fuegos and is now the front man of the Grammy-winning group Dan Zanes and Friends.

History
Zanes's father was a teacher, as well as a poet and writer.

Zanes attended Phillips Academy in Andover, Massachusetts for two years.  Zanes ended up living on the outskirts of Concord, New Hampshire.

The Del Fuegos
The Del Fuegos played in lofts, bars, warehouses, small art galleries, clubs, barns, college dining halls, fraternity houses, gymnasiums, auditoriums, and, finally, big theaters.

Rolling Stone named the Del Fuegos "Best New Band" in 1984. With the Del Fuegos, Zanes made several records – The Longest Day (1984), Boston, Mass (1985), Stand Up (1987), Smoking in the Fields (1989) – and had a hit single, Don't Run Wild. In 1987, Zanes married Paula Greif, the director of the video for the Del Fuegos song, I Still Want You.

Family music
After Zanes and his wife at the time, Paula Greif, had a baby girl, they moved to New York City. Zanes subsequently began playing music with a group of other fathers that he had met in West Village playgrounds who were also there with their kids. These fathers playing music together eventually became the Wonderland String Band, which played at parks and parties and on a tape of songs that Zanes recorded at his home.

The tape was a hit locallyi.e. on the playgrounds where he and his daughter playedand Zanes realized that he liked making music that families could enjoy together, as opposed to music that is just for children or just for adults. So, he added a small number of women to his band, renamed it the Rocket Ship Revue, and began making a full-length homemade album, enlisting the help of some people he had met when he was a Del FuegoSheryl Crow, Suzanne Vega, and Simon Kirke, the drummer for Bad Company.

The album, Rocket Ship Beach (2000), was also a hit. The New York Times Magazine called it "cool", and added, "Mostly, though, Zanes' kids music works because it is not kids music; it's just musicmusic that's unsanitized, unpasteurized, that's organic even."  Sheryl Crow and Suzanne Vega made guest appearances on the album.  The second album, Family Dance (2001) is composed of dance songs from a wide variety of musical traditions and features Loudon Wainwright III and Rosanne Cash. The third recording, the more mellow Night Time! (2002), features collaborations with Aimee Mann, Lou Reed, John Doe, Dar Williams, and other established musicians.

In 2003, he played himself on Dragon Tales Let's Start a Band on TV film. The fourth album in the family series is House Party (2003), a rambunctious 20-song collection with a diverse instrumentation that, in addition to the usual guitars, banjos, upright bass and drums, includes such instruments as violin, tuba, accordion, trombone, pump organ, djembe and saw. House Party was nominated for a Grammy in the Musical Album for Children category.  Music video selections from the House Party album played during the Disney Channel's morning program suite known as Playhouse Disney from 2005–2007. New music video selections occasionally play on Nickelodeon's Noggin.

In 2007, Zanes received the Grammy Award for Best Musical Album for Children for Catch That Train! (2006) and produced a children's reggae CD with Father Goose called "Its a Bam Bam Diddly", which also features songs performed by Sister Carol and Sheryl Crow.

In early 2009, Zanes' ¡Nueva York! (2008) won in The 8th Annual Independent Music Awards for Best Children's Music Album.

His seventh album 76 Trombones (2009) was a Broadway/Showtune themed album, featuring guest vocalists Matthew Broderick, Carol Channing, and Brian Stokes Mitchell.

Discography

With the Del Fuegos
The Longest Day (1984)
Boston, Mass. (1985)
Spin Radio Concert (1985)
Stand Up (1987)
Smoking in the Fields (1989)
Silver Star (2012)

SoloCool Down Time (1995)

Family music albums
 Rocket Ship Beach (2000)
 Family Dance (2001)
 Night Time! (2002)
 House Party (2003)
 All Around the Kitchen! (2005)
 Catch That Train! (2006)
 The Welcome Table (2008)
 ¡Nueva York! (2008)
 76 Trombones (2009)
 The Fine Friends Are Here! (2009)
 Little Nut Tree (2011)
 Turn Turn Turn (2013) with Elizabeth Mitchell
 Get Loose and Get Together!: The Best of Dan Zanes (2014)
 Lead Belly, Baby! (2017)
 Night Train 57 (2018) with Claudia Eliaza and Yuriana Sobrino

Traditional music albums
 Sea Music (2003)
including "Oh Shenandoah", "Sloop John B", "The John B. Sails", and "Deep Blue Sea"
 Parades and Panoramas: 25 Songs Collected by Carl Sandburg for the American Songbag (2004)
including "The Midnight Train", "Hallelujah, I'm a Bum", and "Lord Lovel"

With Claudia Eliaza Zanes
 Let Love Be Your Guide (2021)

Singles
 2001: Hello 2002: Smile Smile Smile 2003: All Around the Kitchen 2006: Catch That Train!Filmography
 2003 — Let’s Start a Band: A Dragon Tales Music Special 2008 –  Revolutionary Road 2009 – Wonderful World'' – Sweeny

References

External links

 Goose Music
 Audio interview with Marc Maron

American children's musicians
American male singers
Living people
1961 births
Grammy Award winners
Independent Music Awards winners
Singers from New York City
Musicians from Brooklyn
Private Music artists
People from Exeter, New Hampshire